This is a list of candidates of the 1981 New South Wales state election. The election was held on 19 September 1981.

Retiring Members

Labor
 Gordon Barnier MLA (Blacktown)
 Syd Einfeld MLA (Waverley)
 Harry Jensen MLA (Munmorah)
 Lew Johnstone MLA (Broken Hill)
 Cliff Mallam MLA (Campbelltown)
 Kath Anderson MLC
 Peter McMahon MLC
 Herb McPherson MLC
 Robert Melville MLC

Liberal
 Dick Healey MLA (Davidson)
 John Mason MLA (Dubbo)
 Roger de Bryon-Faes MLC
 Vi Lloyd MLC

National Country
 Tim Bruxner MLA (Tenterfield)
 George Freudenstein MLA (Young)
 Peter King MLA (Oxley)
 John Sullivan MLA (Sturt)
 Jim Taylor MLA (Temora)
 Leo Connellan MLC

Legislative Assembly
Sitting members are shown in bold text. Successful candidates are highlighted in the relevant colour. Where there is possible confusion, an asterisk (*) is also used.

Legislative Council
Sitting members are shown in bold text. Tickets that elected at least one MLC are highlighted in the relevant colour. Successful candidates are identified by an asterisk (*).

See also
 Members of the New South Wales Legislative Assembly, 1981–1984
 Members of the New South Wales Legislative Council, 1981–1984

References
 
 Parliament of New South Wales. Parliamentary Papers (1981–82).

1981